Telets, a member of the Ugain clan, was the ruler of Bulgaria from 762 to 765.  Byzantine sources indicate that Telets replaced the legitimate rulers of Bulgaria.  The same sources describe Telets as a brave and energetic man in his prime (about 30 years old).  Scholars have conjectured that Telets may have belonged to an anti-Slavic faction of the Bulgarian nobility.

After his accession, Telets led a well-trained and well-armed army against the Byzantine Empire and devastated the Empire's frontier zone, inviting the emperor to a contest of strength.  Emperor Constantine V Kopronymos marched north on June 16, 763, while another army was carried by a fleet of 800 ships (each carrying infantry and 12 horsemen) with the intent to create a pincer movement from the north.

Telets at first fortified the mountain passes with his troops and some twenty thousand Slavic auxiliaries. Later he changed his mind and led out his troops to the plain of Anchialos (Pomorie) on June 30.  The bloody battle of Anchialus then began at mid-morning, and lasted until dusk.  At the end, Telets' Slavic auxiliaries deserted him for the emperor, who won the field but chose to return home in triumph.  According to the Byzantine sources, Constantine V brought home a throng of Bulgarian prisoners in wooden restraints, for the entertainment of Constantinople's populace.

The military defeat sealed the fate of Telets, who was lynched together with his supporters by his rebellious subjects.

See also
History of Bulgaria
Bulgars

References
 Mosko Moskov, Imennik na bălgarskite hanove (novo tălkuvane), Sofia 1988.
 Jordan Andreev, Ivan Lazarov, Plamen Pavlov, Koj koj e v srednovekovna Bălgarija, Sofia 1999.
 (primary source), Bahši Iman, Džagfar Tarihy, vol. III, Orenburg 1997.

730s births
765 deaths
8th-century murdered monarchs
Monarchs of the Bulgars
Murdered Bulgarian monarchs
8th-century Bulgarian monarchs
Bulgarian people of the Byzantine–Bulgarian Wars
Turkic rulers